Garry Mark Porterfield (born August 4, 1943) is a former American football defensive end in the National Football League for the Dallas Cowboys. He also was a member of the BC Lions in the Canadian Football League. He played college football at the University of Tulsa.

Early years
Porterfield attended Bixby High School. He accepted a football scholarship from the University of Tulsa, where he was a two-way end.

Professional career
Porterfield was selected by the Dallas Cowboys in the 14th round (187th overall) of the 1965 NFL Draft. He also was selected by the Oakland Raiders in the 17th round (131st overall) of the 1965 AFL Draft. In December 1964, he opted to sign with the Cowboys. He was considered a defensive end, before switching to linebacker and then to offensive guard. He was waived on September 30.

In October 1965, he signed with the BC Lions of the Canadian Football League, where he played 2 seasons at outside linebacker. He was released in 1967.

Personal life
In 1968, he was named the offensive line coach at the University of Tulsa.

References

External links
Garry Porterfield Stats

1943 births
Living people
People from Pawnee, Oklahoma
Players of American football from Oklahoma
American football defensive ends
Tulsa Golden Hurricane football players
Dallas Cowboys players
BC Lions players
Tulsa Golden Hurricane football coaches